Bean Lake is a lake in Platte County in the U.S. state of Missouri.

Bean Lake has the name of Benjamin Bean, a pioneer citizen.

References

Bodies of water of Platte County, Missouri
Lakes of Missouri